Cratystylis conocephala, the blue bush daisy, blue bush, grey bush, and round leaved greybush, is a species of flowering plant in the family Asteraceae, native to southeast Western Australia, South Australia, New South Wales, and Victoria. It is a densely branched, spreading shrub. The species is listed as endangered in New South Wales and critically endangered in Victoria.

Description 
 
It is a silver to blue-grey shrub which grows erectly to a height range of 0.7-1.8m. The stems are erect, woody and densely arranged and forms a gnarled trunk. The bark is fibrous, with younger stems covered densely in short, matted, wooly hairs.

Leaves are wedge-shaped to oval shaped and have a prominent midvein and are grey and wooly on both sides. Leaves are 4-10 mm long and 2-5 mm wide.

Flowerheads are 12-15mm long and 3-8mm in diameter and are stalkless. Obtuse involucral bracts are 3-7mm long, green and sparsely hairy. Florets 4-6; corollas 10-12mm long and white in colour. Achenes 3-4mm long when not fully developed (abortive) and 6-7mm when fertile.

Flowering time occurs from September to December.

Ecology 
C. conocephala is found on calcareous red soils and sandy soils in different ecosystem types. These include mallee, coastal scrub and woodland vegetation communities. Blue bush daisy proliferates in ecosystems which have not been exposed to fire for extended periods of time.

Distribution 
Cratystylus conocephala  is found in the IBRA (Interim Biogeographic Regionalisation for Australia) of Coolgardie, Hampton, Mallee (Victoria), Mallee and Nullarbor. on calcerous red soils and sandy soils in Western Australia, South Australia, Northern Territory, New South Wales and Victoria. The species is very rare in the Southern Far Western Plains of New South Wales, and Belah Woodlands of North West Victoria. It is found to grow in mallee, coastal scrub and woodland vegetation communities.

References

Inuleae
Endemic flora of Australia
Flora of Western Australia
Flora of South Australia
Flora of New South Wales
Flora of Victoria (Australia)
Plants described in 1905